The Belorussian retail market is largely dominated by local supermarket chains, currently the only foreign chains operating within Belarus are Russian retail chains.
A report in 2007 found that there was 170 chain operated stores, With Vesta operating the most stores, with 48 outlets, and Vestor the least with only 2 outlets.

Current chains

Hardware store chains

Defunct chains

References

Supermarket
Belarus